The Karanle is a major Somali, sub clan of Hawiye. The Karanle inhabit Galgaduud, Banadir, Mogadishu, Hiiraan, Shabeellaha Hoose, Lower Juba and Mudug regions in Somalia; the Somali Region of Ethiopia; the region of Oromia surrounding the city of Harar and North Eastern Province in Kenya.

The Karanle are traditionally the eldest subclan of Hawiye and have played an important role in mediation. They are said to be the maternal ancestors of many large clan families such as the Hiraab, the Bimal and some Ogaden subclans.  

The Karanle are credited for fighting foreign invaders which they historically share a long border with in Ethiopia.

Karanle are divided into four subclans

Kaariye Karanle
Gidir Karanle
Seexawle Karanle
Murusade Karanle

Notable Karanle members 

 Ahmad ibn Ibrahim al-Ghazi, Somali Imam and General of the Adal Sultanate, Ruler of Harar and Conqueror of Ethiopia

 Hassan Ali Khaire, Prime Minister of Somalia, 2017–2020

 Abdulkadir Yahya Ali, Peace Activist, Founder of the Center for Research and Dialogue

 Ali Mohamed Osoble "Wardhigley", MP Elected from Mogadishu, Minister of Information, Health and Labour, Vice Chairman of SNM, Chairman of USC

 Mohamed Afrah Qanyare, Politician, Businessman, Chairman of the Alliance for the Restoration of Peace and Counter-Terrorism (ARPCT) 

 Hassan Moalim, Minister, Power Broker, Chairman of Daljir Party

References

Ethnic groups in Somalia
Somali clans
Somali clans in Ethiopia